Bayttaab Dil Kee Tamanna Hai is an Indian television series that aired on Sony Entertainment Television. The series premiered on 6 October 2009 and was concluded on 24 February 2010. According to reports, the channel spent Rs. 50 million to promote the series on Indian news channels, such as Aaj Tak and STAR News. The series was created by Ekta Kapoor and was produced by her production company Balaji Telefilms.

Plot

Three sisters Shamoli, Kanchan and Kakoon  arrive in Mumbai from their village in search of livelihood. At first, they have to face terrible hardship in the new city. But soon they find help from Veeru, the chauffeur and protege of a powerful and wealthy lawyer named Kunal Mehra, who has never faced defeat in a single case. Veeru gets jobs for Kanchan and Shamoli as maids in Kunal's home. Shamoli impresses Kunal with her presence of mind, and once saves him from a very difficult situation. The middle-aged Kunal, a confirmed bachelor for years, though at first avoids Shamoli because of her status, later feels attracted and proposes to her, leaving Shamoli in confusion. He does not know that she and Veeru love each other. Unknown to them all, Kanchan also silently loves Veeru.

Kakoon, the little sister, has a major accident and needs expensive treatment at once. Veeru tries his best to help and even takes loans, but that is still insufficient. Kunal has meanwhile given Shamoli a proposal to either marry him or leave. Being rich, only Kunal is in a position to help, so Shamoli having no other alternative quickly decides to accept his proposal and marries him. This angers Veeru and Kanchan, who believe Shamoli has lost her head over Kunal's wealth. Rejected by her loved ones, Shamoli struggles to be accepted in her husband's elite social circle, where she is often tormented and humiliated by Karishma, the wife of Kunal's brother. She gradually falls in love with Kunal.

Shamoli's resolve is tested further when Veeru comes to live in Kunal's house, following a surprise revelation that the two men are long-lost brothers. Then, Kunal learns the truth that Shamoli had married him only to save her little sister's life and that she used to love Veeru. He becomes upset and in anger, drives both Shamoli and Veeru out of his house. But he later feels regret and decides to set her free from their marriage, send her back to Veeru and leave the city. However, Shamoli realizes that she now loves Kunal and not Veeru, so she chooses to stay with her husband. Kanchan and Shamoli reconcile with each other. Veeru accepts the fact that Shamoli is now Kunal's wife and despite Kunal's insistence to stay with them, decides to stay away from them until he achieves his dream of becoming a lawyer. In the end, Veeru accomplishes his goal and marries Kanchan, giving recognition to her love for Veeru. He then pays a visit to his brother's house, and the show ends with both the brothers and the sisters united.

Cast
 Sumana Das as Shamoli Kunal Mehra
 Aman Verma as Advocate Kunal Mehra
 Karan Kundra as Veeru
 Priyamvada Kant as Kanchan
 Pragati Chourasiya as Kakoon
 Varun Kapoor as Varun Mehra 
 Urvashi Dholakia as Karishma Mehra
 Nitin Chatterjee as Aarav (Veeru's confidant & childhood friend)
 Ashlesha Sawant as Lekha

Crossover
Special crossover with Pyaar Ka Bandhan on 24 December 2009 and 28 December 2009 on Sony Entertainment Television.

References

External links
 Official site on Sony TV India

Balaji Telefilms television series
Sony Entertainment Television original programming
Indian drama television series
Indian television soap operas
2009 Indian television series debuts
2010 Indian television series endings
Television shows set in Mumbai